Kolyada or Koliada (Russian and Ukrainian: Коляда) is a gender-neutral Slavic surname derived from the word koliada. It may refer to:

 Ihor Koliada (born 1964), Ukrainian footballer
 Mikhail Kolyada (born 1995), Russian figure skater
 Nikolay Kolyada (born 1957), Soviet-Russian writer and playwright
 Oksana Koliada (born 1980), Ukrainian politician
 Sergei Kolyada (1907–1996), Soviet portrait artist

See also
 
 

Russian-language surnames
Ukrainian-language surnames